Detk is a village (population 1,210 (2008 (est.)) in Heves county in Hungary, situated near Gyöngyös on the north-western edge of the Great Hungarian Plain. The landscape to the north and west of the village is scarred by Mátrai Erőmű's large open-cast lignite mine. The village is most famous for its biscuit company, Detki Keksz Kft., whose factory is located in the neighbouring village of Halmajugra.

Notes 

Populated places in Heves County